With Drums and Trumpets is a Canadian documentary film, directed by Marcel Carrière and released in 1967. The film depicts a group of men in Coaticook, Quebec who are performing the roles of the papal zouaves in a historical reenactment of Capture of Rome during the Italian Risorgimento.

The film won the Canadian Film Award for Best Documentary Under 30 Minutes at the 20th Canadian Film Awards in 1968.

References

External links
 Avec tambours et trompettes at the National Film Board of Canada

1967 films
Canadian short documentary films
Films shot in Quebec
Films directed by Marcel Carrière
National Film Board of Canada short films
Best Short Documentary Film Genie and Canadian Screen Award winners
National Film Board of Canada documentaries
French-language Canadian films
1960s Canadian films